The Redcar Mudstone Formation is a geological formation in North Yorkshire, England. Part of the Lias Group, it was deposited in the Hettangian to Pliensbachian stages of the Early Jurassic. The lithology consists of fissile mudstones and siltstones, with the lower part having thin beds of limestone and the upper part having thin beds of sandstone. The Redcar Mudstone Formation at Wine Haven, Robin Hood's Bay, Yorkshire contains the Global Boundary Stratotype Section and Point (GSSP) for the base of the Pliensbachian.

References

Further reading 
 J. Gründel, A. Kaim, A. Nützel and C. T. S. Little. 2011. Early Jurassic Gastropods form England. Palaeontology 54(3):481-510

Geologic formations of England
Jurassic System of Europe
Jurassic England
Hettangian Stage
Pliensbachian Stage
Sinemurian Stage
Mudstone formations
Siltstone formations
Shallow marine deposits
Paleontology in England